Runner Runner is the debut studio album by American pop rock band Runner Runner. It was originally scheduled for a September 28, 2010 release, but was pushed back until 2011. The album was released on February 15, 2011, through David Letterman's record label, Clear Entertainment/C.E. Music of Capitol Records. It peaked at number 185 on the Billboard 200 and number 3 on the Billboard Top Heatseekers.

The album's lead single, "So Obvious", was released on May 18, 2010, and has since become a moderate success, peaking at number 37 on the Billboard Pop Songs chart. The album has since spawned two more singles: "Unstoppable" and "Hey Alli".

Track listing

Personnel
 Dave Darling – Producer
 Ryan Ogren – Vocals, guitar
 Peter Munters – Guitars, vocals, keyboards
 Nick Bailey – Guitars, background vocals
 Jon Berry – Bass, background vocals
 James Ulrich – Drums
 Jim Recor – Management for Clear Entertainment
 Dale May – Photography

Charts

References

2011 debut albums
Runner Runner (band) albums
Capitol Records albums
Albums produced by Dave Darling